Dishonoured cheques (also spelled check) are cheques that a bank on which is drawn declines to pay (“honour”). There are a number of reasons why a bank would  refuse to honour a cheque, with non-sufficient funds (NSF) being the most common one, indicating that there are insufficient cleared funds in the account on which the cheque was drawn.  An NSF check may be referred to as a bad check, dishonored check, bounced check, cold check, rubber check, returned item, or hot check. Lost or bounced checks result in late payments and affect the relationship with customers. In England and Wales and Australia, such cheques are typically returned endorsed "Refer to drawer", an instruction to contact the person issuing the cheque for an explanation as to why it was not paid. If there are funds in an account, but insufficient cleared funds, the cheque is normally endorsed “Present again”, by which time the funds should have cleared.

When more than one cheque is presented for payment on the same day, and the payment of both would result in the account becoming overdrawn (or below some approved credit limit), the bank has a discretion as to which cheque to pay and which to dishonour. A bank has a general discretion whether or not to honour a cheque that will result in an account becoming overdrawn, but a payment on one occasion does not bind the bank to do so again on another occasion. A bank cannot partially pay on a cheque, so that it must either pay a cheque in full or dishonour it. If a bank declines to pay a cheque, it must promptly return the cheque to the person who deposited it or presented it to be cashed. In general, a bank can only pay out of the account on which it was drawn, and cannot draw on any other account that the customer may have at the bank, unless expressly instructed to the contrary.

Reasons for dishonour
Cheques may be dishonoured by a financial institution because:
 There are insufficient cleared funds in the account to cover the value of the cheque.
 The account holder has instructed the bank not to pay the cheque (called a stopped cheque).
 The account holder's funds have been frozen.
 The account does not actually exist, either due to a false cheque being presented, an error in writing the account number, or the account being closed. 
 The cheque has expired, is cashed before the date on the cheque, or the date on the cheque is erroneous.
 There is a discrepancy in the amounts written in numbers and the amount in words.
 The cheque is scribbled or overwritten.
 The signature on the cheque does not match the signature on file of the account holder or an authorised signatory on the account, or has touched the MICR strip on the cheque.
 The cheque is damaged.

Process

If a bank receives a cheque that it would normally dishonour, such as there being insufficient funds in an account on which it is drawn, the manager may as a courtesy contact the customer to advise them of the situation to allow them to rectify the situation promptly to avoid a cheque being dishonoured. The bank is not obliged to contact the customer, and is unlikely to do so more than once. 

When a cheque is dishonoured, the bank customer may be charged a dishonour fee by their bank. If paying the cheque would result in the account becoming overdrawn, the bank may in its discretion still to honour the cheque. In this situation, the bank may charge an overdraft establishment fee, in addition to interest at the overdraft rate until the account is back in credit. 

If a cheque is dishonoured for any reason, the bank on which it is drawn must promptly return the cheque to the depositor's (payee’s) bank, which will ultimately return it to the depositor. The depositor’s bank will debit the amount of the cheque from the depositor's account into which it had been deposited, as well as a service fee. 

Depending on the reason for a cheque being dishonoured, the depositor may determine whether to re-submit the cheque, hoping it will be paid on a second attempt, or else proceed immediately with collection activities, civil or criminal.

Consequences of insufficient funds
Among the consequences of issuing a NSF cheque are actions by financial institutions, civil liability to the drawee, and possible criminal penalties. When a bad cheque is negotiated, the recipient of the cheque may choose to take action against the drawer. The action that is taken may be a civil collection action or lawsuit, or seeking criminal charges, depending on the amount of the cheque and the laws in the jurisdiction where the cheque is drawn.

Civil consequences
If the dishonored check has been scanned and replaced by a substitute check, the original check is not returned to the depositor, but instead the substitute check will be marked "not sufficient funds" and returned to the depositor.  The recipient may choose not to accept checks in the future from the writer (typically recorded on a paper or electronic "Do not accept checks from..." list), or may suspend the check-writer's privileges until the check-writer has made good on the debt.

The recipient may also choose to report the writer to a database service. This may lead to other merchants in the future refusing to accept checks from the writer or a joint account holder, or the writer having trouble obtaining a checking account at another bank.  If a merchant or other place of business receives too many bad checks from customers, it may simply decide to not accept any checks at all from anyone.

Criminal consequences
In some cases the issuance of a NSF check may result in criminal prosecution of the drawer of the check. Criminal charges are more likely where the drawer can be shown to have issued the check knowing that it would not be honored. Charges are also more likely when the NSF check is for a large amount, or where the drawer issues multiple NSF checks.

Prevention
Steps that can be taken to reduce the likelihood of a bad check include:
Carrying a higher balance in the checking account; that is to always have a "buffer" amount just in case an unexpected check does clear.
Better balancing techniques
Overdraft protection - This may be in the form of a link to a savings account from which funds will be automatically transferred, a credit card, or, a line of credit designed specially for this purpose.
Using a credit/debit card or cash instead of checks.

Legal issues

Australia
The Cheques Act 1986 (Cth) imposes strict liability on the drawer of a dishonoured cheque. The payee may sue the drawer on the cheque itself, who may not have been the original debtor.

India
In India, a bounced check is a criminal offense, punishable by fines and/or jail term, under Section 138 of the Negotiable Instruments Act, 1881.

United Arab Emirates 
Until January 2013, a bounced check was a criminal offense in the United Arab Emirates that led to imprisonment of the person who wrote it.

United States
In many jurisdictions in the United States, a bad check restitution program exists that allows recipients of bad checks to collect the funds from the local district attorney's office, regardless of the amount. An agency run by the district attorney will pursue the drawer of the check by attempting to collect the funds in exchange for avoiding criminal prosecution. The check drawer will be responsible to cover the amount of the check, plus all fees to which the recipient is legally entitled, plus a program fee. The drawer will also be required to take a course designed to improve check-writing habits. These programs are controversial and in recent years, have come under fire in lawsuits. Normally, if check writer can cover up their bad credits in sixty days, all charges will be dropped.

In some jurisdictions, for a criminal prosecution on a bad check there must be some element of fraud involved in the issuance of the check. In some U.S. states, if the check drawer informs the party they are uttering the check to that it will not clear at the current time (such as asking someone to “hold” a check for a few days), if the check bounces, they can still be sued for the value of the check, but warning the recipient before acceptance that the check will not clear immediately negates the element of fraud and prevents criminal prosecution. For similar reasons, a post-dated check will not normally support a conviction for issuing a NSF check.

United Kingdom
In England and Wales, the use of the endorsement "refer to drawer" has become standard after a bank was successfully sued for libel after returning a cheque incorrectly endorsed "insufficient funds"; the court ruled that, as there were sufficient funds, the statement was demonstrably false and damaging to the reputation of the person issuing the cheque. Even with the use of this revised endorsement, the mere implication that funds were insufficient has been held to be libelous in other cases of banks mistakenly refusing to pay cheques.

See also
Bad check restitution program
Check fraud
ChexSystems

References

External links
 National Check Fraud Center. Explains the laws pertaining to bad checks in all fifty U.S. states.